Robert Hendry Morton (25 September 1927 – 6 May 2002) was an English professional footballer who played for Luton Town. Morton holds the record for most appearances for the club, with 495 in the Football League and 550 overall.

Playing career
Morton started out playing locally at Waterlows, but signed amateur forms with Luton Town as the war drew to an end. Luton signed him on a professional contract a year later, in 1946. Morton made his debut on 30 October 1948, playing at centre-forward as Luton beat West Ham United 1–0 at Upton Park.

Morton was equally good as a forward or as a wing half, and whether he was scoring goals or stopping them at the other end he was an ever-present in the Luton team. Morton left Luton in 1964, at the age of 38. He spent a spell as player-manager of Bletchley Town, before retiring altogether.

References

External links
Post War English & Scottish Football League A - Z Player's Transfer Database profile

1927 births
2002 deaths
Footballers from Luton
English Football League players
English footballers
Luton Town F.C. players
Association football wing halves
English football managers
FA Cup Final players